Francisco Borja was a Roman Catholic prelate who served as Bishop of Teano (1508–1531).

Biography
On 5 July 1508, Francisco Borja was appointed by Pope Julius II as Bishop of Teano.
He served as Bishop of Teano until his resignation in 1531.

See also
Catholic Church in Italy

References

External links and additional sources
 (for Chronology of Bishops) 
 (for Chronology of Bishops) 

16th-century Italian Roman Catholic bishops
Bishops appointed by Pope Julius II